The 1979–80 NC State Wolfpack men's basketball team represented North Carolina State University as a member of the Atlantic Coast Conference during the 1979–80 men's college basketball season. Led by head coach Norm Sloan, in his 14th and final season at NC State, the Wolfpack played their home games at Reynolds Coliseum in Raleigh, North Carolina.

After finishing tied for 2nd in the ACC regular season standings, NC State was dismissed from the ACC tournament by Duke in the quarterfinals. The Wolfpack received a bid to the NCAA tournament as No. 4 seed in the East region. No. 5 seed Iowa end NC State's season in the second round, 77–64. The Hawkeyes would go on to reach the Final Four.

Roster

Schedule

|-
!colspan=12 style=| Regular season

|-
!colspan=12 style=| ACC Tournament

|-
!colspan=12 style=| NCAA Tournament

Rankings

References

NC State Wolfpack men's basketball seasons
Nc State
Nc State
NC State Wolfpack men's basketball
NC State Wolfpack men's basketball